The Korea Stamp Corporation is the issuing authority of postage stamps in North Korea.

See also

Postage stamps and postal history of North Korea

References

External links

Korea Stamp Corporation at Stampworld

Companies based in Pyongyang
1946 establishments in North Korea